is a multi-purpose sports complex located in Ikushima-chō, Takamatsu, Kagawa Prefecture, Japan. It houses Olive Field, a secondary baseball field, and fields for rugby, soccer, tennis, and softball.

The Kagawa Olive Guyners, a baseball team playing in Shikoku Island League, mainly play their home games here.

Baseball venues in Japan
Sports venues in Kagawa Prefecture
Takamatsu, Kagawa